The 1993 KAL Cup Korea Open was a men's tennis tournament played on outdoor hard courts that was part of the World Series of the 1993 ATP Tour. It was the seventh edition of the tournament and was played in Seoul in South Korea from 19 April through 26 April 1993. Eighth-seeded Chuck Adams won the singles title.

Finals

Singles

 Chuck Adams defeated  Todd Woodbridge 6–4, 6–4
 It was Adams' only title of the year and the 1st of his career.

Doubles

 Jan Apell /  Peter Nyborg defeated  Neil Broad /  Gary Muller 5–7, 7–6, 6–2
 It was Apell's only title of the year and the 1st of his career. It was Nyborg's only title of the year and the 1st of his career.

References

External links
 ITF tournament edition details

KAL Cup Korea Open
Seoul Open
1993 Seoul Open